John Black Cowan (1828-1896) was Regius Professor of Materia Medica at the University of Glasgow.

References

External links 

Academics of the University of Glasgow
1828 births
1896 deaths